Lord Lovelace may refer to:

 Baron Lovelace
 Earl of Lovelace